Iphthiminus italicus is a species of darkling beetles in the subfamily Tenebrioninae.

Subspecies
Iphthiminus italicus bellardi (Truqui, 1857) 
Iphthiminus italicus croaticus (Truqui, 1857) 
Iphthiminus italicus italicus (Truqui, 1857)

Distribution
This species is present in Albania, Bosnia, Croatia, Greece and Italy.

References

Tenebrioninae
Tenebrionidae genera
Endemic arthropods of Italy
Beetles described in 1857